SM UB-118 was a German Type UB III submarine or U-boat in the German Imperial Navy during World War I. She was commissioned into the German Imperial Navy on 22 January 1918 as SM UB-118.

UB-118 was surrendered to the Allies at Harwich on 21 November 1918 in accordance with the requirements of the Armistice with Germany.

Construction

She was built by AG Weser of Bremen and following just under a year of construction, launched at Bremen on 13 December 1917. UB-118 was commissioned early the next year under the command of Kptlt. Hermann Arthur Krauß. Like all Type UB III submarines, UB-118 carried 10 torpedoes and was armed with a  deck gun. UB-118 had a displacement of  while surfaced and  when submerged. Her engines enabled her to travel at  when surfaced and  when submerged.

Summary of raiding history

References

Notes

Citations

Bibliography 

 

German Type UB III submarines
World War I submarines of Germany
U-boats commissioned in 1918
1917 ships
Ships built in Bremen (state)
U-boats sunk in 1919